The Salvin's anetia (Anetia cubana) is a species of nymphalid butterfly in the Danainae subfamily. It is endemic to Cuba.

References

Sources
 IUCN Red List of All Threatened Species. 

Anetia
Butterflies of Cuba
Endemic fauna of Cuba
Near threatened fauna of North America
Butterflies described in 1869
Taxonomy articles created by Polbot
Taxa named by Osbert Salvin